Fabián Trujillo (born July 6, 1986 in Montevideo) is a Uruguayan footballer who plays for La Luz FC.

Career
He had a short spell with Omani giants, Dhofar S.C.S.C. in Salalah.

In 2010, he played the Copa Libertadores with C.A. Cerro.

Teams
  Cerro 2007–2009
  Dhofar S.C.S.C. 2009
  Cerro 2009–2011
  Fenix 2011–2012
  Cerro 2012–2013

Honours
Cerro
Liguilla Pre-Libertadores 2009

External links
 Profile at Tenfield 
 

Living people
Association football midfielders
C.A. Cerro players
Uruguayan footballers
Dhofar Club players
Centro Atlético Fénix players
Uruguayan expatriate footballers
Expatriate footballers in Oman
1986 births
Uruguayan expatriate sportspeople in Oman